Shenae Ciesiolka (born 7 August 1997) is an Australian rugby league footballer who plays as a er for the Brisbane Broncos in the NRL Women's Premiership and Valleys Diehards in the QRL Women's Premiership.

Prior to switching to rugby league, she represented the Australia rugby sevens team.

Background
Ciesiolka was born in Toowoomba, Queensland and played rugby league, rugby union and touch football growing up. In 2013, she represented the Australian under-18 touch team against New Zealand.

Playing career

Rugby sevens
In 2014, Ciesiolka represented Australia in rugby sevens at the 2014 Summer Youth Olympics, winning a gold medal. On 3 July 2015, she signed with the Australia sevens program. In April 2016, she made her debut for Australia at the 2016 Canada Women's Sevens.

After two years in the Australian program, Ciesiolka returned to Queensland, playing for the University of Queensland at the 2018 and 2019 Aon University Sevens series.

Rugby league
In September 2020, Ciesiolka switched to rugby league, joining the Brisbane Broncos NRL Women's Premiership squad. In Round 2 of the 2020 NRL Women's season, she made her debut for the Broncos, coming off the bench in an 18–4 win over the St George Illawarra Dragons.

On 13 November 2020, Ciesiolka made her State of Origin debut for Queensland, starting on the wing in their 24–18 win over New South Wales.

In 2021, she joined the Valleys Diehards in the QRL Women's Premiership, starting in the centres and scoring a try in their Grand Final loss to the Burleigh Bears. On 25 June 2021, she started on the wing for Queensland in their 8–6 win over New South Wales.

Achievements and accolades

Team
2020 NRLW Grand Final: Brisbane Broncos – Winners

References

External links

Brisbane Broncos profile
Rugby.com.au profile

1997 births
Living people
Australian female rugby sevens players
Australia international rugby sevens players
Australian female rugby league players
Brisbane Broncos (NRLW) players
Rugby sevens players at the 2014 Summer Youth Olympics